Inside the Eye is the fifth and final album by the American band Skin Yard. It was released in 1993, more than a year after the band had decided to break up.

Production
The album contains songs written by Skin Yard before they broke up; it was recorded between April and November of 1992. The album cover art is by Jim Blanchard.

Track listing
 "Inside the Eye" (music: Endino; lyrics: McMillan) - 3:22
 "Miss You" (music: Endino; lyrics: McMillan) - 2:47
 "Not in Love" (music & lyrics: McMillan) - 3:44
 "Undertow" (music: Endino; lyrics: McMillan) - 3:23
 "Wait for More" (music: Endino/McMillan/Pedersen; lyrics: McMillan) - 4:33
 "Fight" (music & lyrics: McMillan) - 3:36
 "Western Wall" (music: McMillan/Pedersen; lyrics: McMillan) - 3:03
 "Across the Wind" (music: Endino/McMillan; lyrics: McMillan) - 4:45
 "Blindfold" (music & lyrics: McMillan) - 4:13
 "Slowdive" (music: Endino/McMillan; lyrics: McMillan) - 4:10

Personnel
 Jim Blanchard - artwork
 Jack Endino - guitar, producer, engineering
 Barrett Martin - drums, congas (track 5)
 Ben McMillan - vocals, rhythm guitar (tracks 6,7,9)
 Pat Pedersen - bass

Beyond The Eye
In 2020 Jack Endino released a remixed version of the album with additional tracks on his Bandcamp page. 

Track listing:
 Inside The Eye REMIX - 03:23
 Miss You REMIX - 02:47
 Not In Love REMIX - 03:45
 Undertow REMIX - 03:25
 Wait For More REMIX - 04:41
 Fight REMIX - 03:37
 Western Wall REMIX - 03:04
 Across The Wind REMIX - 04:42
 Blindfold 1992 ALT VERSION - 04:13
 Slow Dive 1992 ALT VERSION - 04:24
 Inside The Eye 1991 ALT VERSION - 03:37
 Not In Love 1991 ALT VERSION - 03:32
 Blindfold REMIX - 04:13
 Slow Dive REMIX - 04:12

References

External links
Information about Inside the Eye on band page
Information about Inside the Eye on Endino page

Skin Yard albums
1993 albums
Albums produced by Jack Endino